Diachus is a genus of case-bearing leaf beetles in the family Chrysomelidae. There are about 10 described species in Diachus.

Species
These 10 species belong to the genus Diachus:
 Diachus aeruginosus J. L. LeConte, 1880
 Diachus auratus (Fabricius, 1801) (bronze leaf beetle)
 Diachus catarius (Suffrian, 1852)
 Diachus chlorizans (Suffrian, 1852)
 Diachus erasus J. L. LeConte, 1880
 Diachus levis (Haldeman, 1849)
 Diachus luscus (Suffrian, 1858)
 Diachus pallidicornis (Suffrian, 1867)
 Diachus squalens (Suffrian, 1852)
 Diachus subopacus Schaeffer, 1906

References

Further reading

External links

 

Cryptocephalinae
Articles created by Qbugbot
Chrysomelidae genera